The Grand Opera House, also known as the Janey Slaughter Briscoe Grand Opera House is a historic theater in Uvalde, Texas. Built in 1891, it became a premier arts venue in Southwest Texas for plays, musicals, and cultural performances. The Opera house is the oldest functioning theater in the state of Texas and presents plays and concerts by local and touring companies. It was added to the National Register of Historic Places on May 22, 1978.

The Opera House was built by a partnership formed between local businessmen, merchants and ranchers called the Uvalde Real Estate and Building Company. The 2-story brick structure has Richardsonian Romanesque elements in its architecture. In typical Texas opera house style of the period, the building has the auditorium above commercial spaces on the first floor. There were also fashionable offices on the second floor. The Opera House was an immediate success and became the social center of Uvalde and quite well known throughout the region.

The building was sold to Fred Locke in 1900 and the John Nance Garner family in 1916. By the early 1940s, most of the office tenants had moved out, and the building went through a period of decline. In July, 1978, the dilapidated property, now owned by the descendants of Garner, was donated to the City of Uvalde. The city restored the Opera House to its 1890 condition.

See also

National Register of Historic Places listings in Uvalde County, Texas
Recorded Texas Historic Landmarks in Uvalde County

References

Texas Historic Sites Atlas
Uvalde Convention & Visitors Bureau

External links

Janey Slaughter Briscoe Grand Opera House

Buildings and structures in Uvalde County, Texas
Romanesque Revival architecture in Texas
National Register of Historic Places in Uvalde County, Texas
Opera houses on the National Register of Historic Places in Texas
Opera houses in Texas
Recorded Texas Historic Landmarks
Uvalde, Texas